The 1990 season was São Paulo's 61st season since club's existence.

Statistics

Scorers

Managers performance

Overall

{|class="wikitable"
|-
|Games played || 69 (33 Campeonato Paulista, 6 Copa do Brasil, 25 Campeonato Brasileiro, 5 Friendly match)
|-
|Games won || 28 (13 Campeonato Paulista, 3 Copa do Brasil, 10 Campeonato Brasileiro, 2 Friendly match)
|-
|Games drawn || 22 (10 Campeonato Paulista, 2 Copa do Brasil, 7 Campeonato Brasileiro, 3 Friendly match)
|-
|Games lost || 19 (10 Campeonato Paulista, 1 Copa do Brasil, 8 Campeonato Brasileiro, 0 Friendly match)
|-
|Goals scored || 76
|-
|Goals conceded || 50
|-
|Goal difference || +26
|-
|Best result || 6–1 (H) v Noroeste - Campeonato Paulista - 1990.06.19
|-
|Worst result || 0–2 (H) v Palmeiras - Campeonato Paulista - 1990.04.150–2 (A) v Criciúma - Copa do Brasil - 1990.08.02
|-
|Top scorer ||  Diego Aguirre (8)
|-

Friendlies

Copa Amistad

Copa Solidariedad de León

Official competitions

Campeonato Paulista

League table

Matches

Repechage stage

Matches

Record

Copa do Brasil

Round of 64

Round of 32

Eightfinals

Record

Campeonato Brasileiro

League table

Matches

Quarterfinals

Semifinals

Finals

Record

External links
official website 

Brazilian football clubs 1990 season
1990